Tony Chévez (born June 20, 1954) is a former pitcher in Major League Baseball who played for the Baltimore Orioles in their 1977 season. Listed at 5' 11" , 177 lb. , Chévez batted and threw right-handed. He was born Silvio Antonio Aguilera Chévez in Telica, León, Nicaragua.

Chévez became the second Nicaraguan player in the big leagues, as he was signed together with El Presidente Dennis Martínez by Baltimore in 1973. Yet after a promising career in his country and the Orioles Minor League system, Chévez hurt his shoulder in his fourth Major League appearance and was never the same.

Chévez first represented Nicaragua in an international competition at the Torneo de la Amistad (Friendship Tournament), held in Managua in 1971, and was also on the national team at the 1971 Pan American Games in Cali, Colombia. After that, he pitched in the 1972 Amateur World Series held in Managua, where the Nicaraguan team won the bronze medal with a 13–2 record.

Besides, Chévez posted a 54–44 record with a 3.15 ERA in 181 minor league games from 1974 through 1979, striking out 432 batters while walking 245 in 838 innings of work.

In between, Chévez played winter ball with the Indios de Mayagüez of Puerto Rico and for the Tiburones de La Guaira in Venezuela.

Chévez is a long time resident of Rochester, New York, but he and his family have never forgotten their homeland. In 2003, Chévez and his wife Halyma returned to Telica with a small group of friends from their church, in order to build homes for the neediest people. Since then, they have returned periodically with growing support, including donations of medicine and clothing, along with Bible school and supporting baseball instruction for youths aged 13–15.

Sources

1954 births
Living people
Baltimore Orioles players
Charlotte O's players
Indios de Mayagüez players
Expatriate baseball players in Puerto Rico
Major League Baseball pitchers
Major League Baseball players from Nicaragua
Miami Orioles players
Nicaraguan emigrants to the United States
People from León Department
Baseball players at the 1971 Pan American Games
Pan American Games competitors for Nicaragua
Rochester Red Wings players
Tiburones de La Guaira players
Nicaraguan expatriate baseball players in Venezuela